Thomas Murray (7 April 1889 – 1976) was an English professional footballer who played as an inside right.

Career
Born in Middlesbrough, Murray spent his early career with Middlesbrough, Aberdeen, Rangers and Heart of Midlothian. At Hearts he scored 12 goals in 28 league games between August 1911 and April 1912. He joined Bradford City in June 1912.  He made 6 league appearances for Bradford City, scoring 1 goal. He left the club in February 1914 to join  Hull City. For Hull he made a further 2 league appearances before retiring due to injury. He died in 1976.

Sources

References

1889 births
1976 deaths
Footballers from Middlesbrough
English footballers
Association football inside forwards
Middlesbrough F.C. players
Aberdeen F.C. players
Rangers F.C. players
Heart of Midlothian F.C. players
Bradford City A.F.C. players
Hull City A.F.C. players
Scottish Football League players
English Football League players